O Rei do Gado (English: King of Cattle) is a Brazilian telenovela written by Benedito Ruy Barbosa and directed by Luiz Fernando Carvalho that was produced and broadcast on Rede Globo, from 17 June 1996 to 15 February 1997, totaling 209 episodes and 130 in the original version of the SIC in Portugal.

History

Synopsis

First phase 
Occurs during the Second World War in the 1940s. In São Paulo, two families, Berdinazzi and Mezenga have a feud over land. It happens that the children of two families, Giovanna Berdinazzi and Enrico Mezenga, fall in love, going against the fight of his parents, Giuseppe and Antonio. Giovanna and Enrico get married and have one son who is named Bruno, named after a brother of Giovanni, who died in the war and was a close friend of Enrico, despite the enmity between the families.

Second phase 
Occurs in 1996, and Bruno is now a successful farmer, known by the nickname "King of the Cattle" for possessing a large herd. A man of simple habits, to whom the wealth is just something else, Bruno lives an unhappy marriage to Leah and has two sons, Mark and Leah. Upon discovering the betrayal of Leah with the driver Ralf, Bruno divorces her.

When having to solve the problem of occupation of their farms Pereira Barreto, a group of landless led by Regino and his wife Jacira, Bruno knows a day-worker called Luana. The two fall in love, unaware that they are cousins. He begins to find happiness until he meets her uncle - senior Geremias Berdinazzi - a powerful millionaire known as "King of Coffee and Milk" from Guaxupé Minas Gerais. Both man manifest intention of buying land which belonged to their past families. Even long after the rift between the Berdinazzi and Mezenga started.

The day-worker Luana, who lived at the landless camp, was Marietta Berdinazzi, the only niece of Geremias still alive, but long been missing. As he had no heir, the fortune of Geremias has always been an easy target for impostors. Suddenly comes a mysterious Marietta, appearing out of nowhere, saying she was the niece he was looking for. This woman is called Rafaela and she has eyes on the fortune of the producer.

The villain was able to keep all the post niece and heir of the family fortune, she also tried to make an attempt on the life of Geremias for him to die soon and not take her name off the inheritance. In reality Luana appeared and took what was rightfully hers. Geremias still ended up finding another nephew in Italy, the young Giuseppe who returned to Brazil and has inherited the fortune of the farmer with Luana.

Aparicio and Joe Bento, the two singers are passionate about the wilderness that decide to join to form a double hinterland, hence born Saracura and Firefly. Bruno's daughter, Leah, a young sweet and kind, Firefly falls for and against the wishes of the family, he leaves with the road to live their love in a bus followed from city to city.

But the son of Bruno, the rebellious Mark, a young man who was not worried about tomorrow, engages with Liliana Caxias, the daughter of Senator Robert Caxias and deludes the point of abandoning the child. A blow too hard for a dreamy girl who still had to live with the lack of attention his father, who only had their head fixed in the struggle of the landless.

Cast

Special Appearances in Round 1

Ratings

Broadcasters of O Rei do Gado

Americas 
 : Telemundo
 : Azteca 13
 : Telefe / Canal 9 Libertad
 : Canal 13
 : Canal 13 RPC (1998-1999) / Paravisión / Unicanal (2013)

Europe 
 : Magyar Televízió - M1 (1997, original airing), M2 (1998, rerun) and M3 (2015, rerun, currently airing)
 : RTS 1
 : RTRS FTV
 : HRT1 (local title: Stočar)
: RTP Internacional
: ORT

References

External links
  O Rei do Gado - Official website 

1996 Brazilian television series debuts
1997 Brazilian television series endings
1996 telenovelas
TV Globo telenovelas
Television shows set in São Paulo
Brazilian telenovelas
Telenovelas directed by Luiz Fernando Carvalho
Portuguese-language telenovelas